Diethyl toluene diamine (DETDA) is a liquid aromatic organic molecule with formula C11H18N2. It is chemically an aromatic diamine and has the CAS Registry number of 68479-98-1. It has more than one isomer and the mixture of the two main isomers is given a different CAS number of 75389-89-8. It is often marketed as a less toxic version of MDA (4,4'-methylenedianiline). It is also used to replace the more toxic MOCA (4,4'-methylenebis(2-chloroaniline). The toxicology is reasonably well understood.

Uses
DETDA is an industrial chemical used in the injection molding industry. One of the reasons it is used in RIM is because it gives very short demold times. It is also used extensively in polyurethanes and in both spray polyureas and elastomers. When used in elastomer production these can be used as an energy absorbing system in automobiles. It is a diamine and thus in polymer science terms is a Chain extender rather than a chain terminator. Chain extenders (f = 2) and cross linkers (f ≥ 3) are low molecular weight amine terminated compounds that play an important role in polyurea compounds, elastomers and adhesives. DETDA is one such amine and is used extensively in reaction injection molding (RIM) and in polyurethane and polyurea elastomer formulations.

Pyrolysis in combination with other materials can produce a carbon-based molecular sieve. Carbon nanotubes have also been produced and studied with the material. There are other more specialist uses for the material too.

As it is an aromatic amine, its rate of cure is much slower than aliphatic amines and thus used with epoxy resin systems to lengthen the working time or potlife.  These are then used in adhesives, sealants, and paints or coatings. It is often used with epoxy resins for its excellent mechanical properties. Epoxy formulations based on DETDA also tend to have good high temperature properties.

Supply
DETDA is produced globally and is thus fairly strategically important.

See also
 Aniline

References

External websites
  Albermale DETDA
 Safety Data Sheet
 CheMondis DETDA information
 Leticia Chemicals DETDA

Anilines
Diamines